This is a list of mayors of the City of Williamsport, in the U.S. state of  Pennsylvania, from 1866–present.

Maj. James M. Wood, 1866–1867
Dr. William F. Logan, 1867–1869
Peter Herdic, 1869–1870
Maj. James H. Perkins, 1870–1872
Seth W. Starkweather, 1872–1874
Martin Powell, 1874–1876
Seth W. Starkweather, 1876–1878
Henry C. Parsons, 1882–1884
Samuel M. Crans, 1884–1886
William N. Jones, 1886–1888
James S. Foresman, 1888–1890
Frederick H. Keller, 1890–1893
William G. Elliot, 1893–1896
James Mansel, 1896–1899
Samuel N. Williams, 1899–1902
John F. Laedlein, 1902–1905
Seth T. Foresman, 1905–1908
Charles D. Wolfe, 1908–1911
Samuel Stabler, 1911–1916
Jonas Fischer, 1916–1917
Archibald M. Hoagland, 1917–1924
Hugh Gilmore, 1924–1928
Herbert T. Ames, 1928–1932
George K. Harris, 1932–1936
Charles D. Wolfe, 1936–1940
Leo C. Williamson, 1940–1952
Clifford L. Harman, 1952–1956
Thomas H. Levering, 1956–1964
Raymond M. Knaur, 1964–1968
Richard J. Carey, 1968–1972
John R. Coder, 1972–1976
Daniel P. Kirby, 1976–1980
Stephen J. Lucasi, 1980–1988
Jessica L. Bloom, 1988–1992 – First female mayor. Bloom was a former member of City Council. Was the chairwoman of Lycoming County Democratic Party until her death in 2023.
Phillip E. Preziosi, 1992–1996 – Former member of City Police Department. Second officer to win mayor's office.
Steven W. Cappelli, 1996–2000 – Resigned to become State Representative from 83rd legislative district, 2001–2009
Michael R. Rafferty, 2000–2004 – Served nine years on City Council, six years as council president.
Mary B. Wolf, 2004–2008 – Second female mayor. Wolf was a former member of City Council and a former college professor.
Gabriel J. Campana, 2008–2020
Derek Slaughter, 2020 – first African-American male Democratic mayor. Slaughter was a former school teacher.

External links
Official City of Williamsport website